The longfin smooth-head (Conocara macropterum) is a species of fish in the family Alepocephalidae.

Description

The longfin smooth-head is pale brown to black in colour; its name derives from its anal fin, which has a long base and 35–39 finrays. They grow rapidly from infancy; few juveniles of intermediate size are found.

Habitat

Behaviour

A detritivore, the longfin smooth-head is recorded to ingest sediment from the seafloor, taking up with it microfauna such as foraminiferans.

References

Alepocephalidae
Fish described in 1888
Taxa named by Léon Vaillant